Buttonwillow Raceway Park is a motorsports park in Kern County, California,  north of the town of Buttonwillow and  northwest of Bakersfield. Opened in 1995, it is owned and operated by the California Sports Car Club, a region of SCCA, Buttonwillow is the "flagship" track of Cal Club, and is also the location of the Club's administrative offices.

The track offers multiple configurations, with the configuration "Race #13 CW" being the most popular. Many time attack series, most notably Super Lap Battle, hold their events with the 13CW configuration.

The Super Lap Battle is a time attack event held at Buttonwillow since 2004.

The track was repaved in July 2014.

A new, technical circuit is scheduled to finish construction in 2023. The addition will include a new tower building, Tesla Supercharger stations, and new garages. The new track will be named as "The Circuit", with the original track being renamed as "The Classic".

See also
 Willow Springs International Motorsports Park
 Thunderhill Raceway Park

References

External links
Official Track Website
 Trackpedia guide to driving this track
 American Federation of Motorcyclists (AFM) Official Website

Sports venues in Kern County, California
Motorsport venues in California

Road courses in the United States
Sports Car Club of America